Events in 1977 in Japanese television.

Debuts

Ongoing shows
Music Fair, music (1964–present)
Mito Kōmon, jidaigeki (1969–2011)
Sazae-san, anime (1969–present)
Ōedo Sōsamō, anime (1970–1984)
Ōoka Echizen, jidaigeki (1970–1999)
Star Tanjō!, talent (1971–1983)
FNS Music Festival, music (1974–present)
Ikkyū-san, anime (1975–1982)
Panel Quiz Attack 25, game show (1975–present)
Candy Candy, anime (1976–1979)

Endings

See also
1977 in anime
1977 in Japan
List of Japanese films of 1977

References